The Ted Hughes Award is an annual literary prize given to a living UK poet for new work in poetry. It is awarded each spring in recognition of a work from the previous year.

Background
The award was established in 2009 with the permission of Carol Hughes in honour of British Poet Laureate Ted Hughes. Annually the members of the Poetry Society and Poetry Book Society recommend a living UK poet who has completed the newest and most innovative work that year, "highlighting outstanding contributions made by poets to our cultural life." The award seeks to celebrate new work that may fall beyond the conventional realms of poetry, embracing mediums such as music, dance and theatre.  The £5,000 prize funded from the annual honorarium that Poet Laureate Carol Ann Duffy receives as Laureate from The Queen.

Winners

Notes

References

External links
 

British poetry awards
Ted Hughes